The Fazekas Hills are rugged, ice-free hills trending in a north-south direction for  just east of Mount Oona on the east side of Lowery Glacier, in the Queen Elizabeth Range, Antarctica. They were named by the Advisory Committee on Antarctic Names for Stephen P. Fazekas, Sr., a United States Antarctic Research Program meteorologist at South Pole Station, 1958.

Features
Ārai Terraces
Bengaard Peak

References 

Hills of the Ross Dependency
Shackleton Coast